Tappeh Kabud may refer to:
 Tappeh Kabud, Salas-e Babajani
 Tappeh Kabud, Ozgoleh, Salas-e Babajani County
 Tappeh Kabud-e Hasan Gholami, Salas-e Babajani County
 Tappeh Kabud-e Sofla, Salas-e Babajani County
 Tappeh Kabud-e Sofla Abdol Mohammad, Salas-e Babajani County